Laëtitia Eïdo (born October 25, 1985) is a French actress, born to a French father and a Lebanese mother. She is best known as Dr. Shirin El Abed, one of the leading roles in the Israeli Netflix series Fauda, and as the voice of Mira in the Adult Swim adult animated television series Primal.

She is also known for her roles in the American HBO Cinemax Strike Back series, A Borrowed Identity by Eran Riklis and the Israeli production Tel Aviv on Fire. Laëtitia was awarded the Best Actress Award at Montreal's Festival Vues du Monde' at Fespaco and at the Agadir Festival for her title role of the historical character Fatma N'Soumer in the French-Algerian feature film .

Her multicultural background has led to her being cast as various different nationalities and playing roles in several languages.  Eido has worked on both French, American, and other international productions.

Biography
Laëtitia Eïdo was born to a French father and a Lebanese mother.

Acting career
Eïdo has played the roles of strong women both on the big and small screens.

She first trained in classical acting techniques in Paris, she attended workshops with theatre companies such as Peter Brook's or Jacques Lecoq's. She then studied in depth S. Meisner acting techniques in Paris and New York. She thus first started her acting career in the theatre where she interpreted known classical roles such as Andromache, in Racine's Greek tragedy, Eglé, Marivaux's character in the Quarrel.

In 2017 she took part in the new adaptation of the book the 4th wall of Sorj Chalandon staged by Arnaud Stéphan, at the National Theatre of Bretagne in Rennes. She then directed her career towards cinema and television. She also starred in the film Tel Aviv on Fire directed by Sameh Zoabi.

In 2014, she took on the role of Fatma n'Soumer, a drama film shot in the Algerian Berber mountains in the Kabyle language, taking on the traits of a resistant woman who repels the first French invasion in 1850. That same year she played Fahima in the drama Dancing Arabs, directed by Eran Riklis.

In 2015, she landed her breakthrough role as Dr. Shirin El Abed in the international television series Fauda.  That same year, she was a ‘Talent’ Alumna at the Berlin Film Festival (2015) and a jury member in festivals like Jerusalem, Oran or Cannes for the ‘Queer Palm’ award.

Awards and nominations
 In 2016, Best Actress - Views of the World Film Festival of Montreal (Fadhma n'Soumer)
 In 2016, Best Actress - Sotigui Awards - Fespaco Festival (Fadhma n'Soumer)
 In 2017, nominated Best Actress - Tribeca Film Festival of New York (Holy Air)
 In 2017, nominated Best Actress - International Film Festival of Jerusalem (Holy Air)

Filmography

References

External links

 
 
 
 

French actresses
21st-century French actresses
French film actresses
French television actresses
French people of Lebanese descent
Living people
1985 births